MV European Highlander is a ferry operated by P&O Irish Sea on their Cairnryan to Larne service. Other differences include minor revisions to the passenger deck layout, additional passenger lifts and the use of larger lifeboats rather than Marine evacuation systems.
On 7 June 2012, it carried the Olympic Flame across the Irish Sea from Northern Ireland to Scotland.

Description 
European Highlander is a two-propeller, Roll-on-Roll off, two compartment passenger and car ferry. She is a sister ship to the European Causeway. Two controllable pitch propellers can propel the ship at 23 knots.

References

External links
P&O Irish Sea European Highlander Information
https://shipfix.com/ship/european-causeway_IMO-9208394

Ferries of Scotland
Ferries of Northern Ireland
2002 ships
Ships of P&O Ferries
Ships built by Mitsubishi Heavy Industries